Dorcadion segovianum is a species of beetle in the family Cerambycidae. It was described by Chevrolat in 1862. It is known from Spain.

Subspecies
 Dorcadion segovianum dejeanii Chevrolat, 1862
 Dorcadion segovianum segovianum Chevrolat, 1862

See also 
Dorcadion

References

segovianum
Beetles described in 1862